1589 Fanatica, provisional designation , is a stony, Vestian asteroid from the inner regions of the asteroid belt, approximately 11 kilometers in diameter. It was discovered on 13 September 1950, by Argentine astronomer Miguel Itzigsohn at La Plata Astronomical Observatory in La Plata, Argentina. It was named after Eva Perón.

Orbit and classification 

Based on its orbital elements, Fanatica is a S-type member of the Vesta family, which is named after 4 Vesta, the third largest body in the main-belt after the dwarf planet 1 Ceres and the minor planet 2 Pallas. Fanatica orbits the Sun at a distance of 2.2–2.6 AU once every 3 years and 9 months (1,372 days). Its orbit has an eccentricity of 0.09 and an inclination of 5° with respect to the ecliptic.

Physical characteristics

Rotation period 

In November 2003, a rotational lightcurve of Fanatica was obtained by astronomer Brian Warner at his Palmer Divide Observatory in Colorado. The light-curve analysis gave a rotation period of 2.58 hours with a brightness variation of 0.16 magnitude. In August 2014, photometric observations by astronomer Robert Stephens gave a period of 2.582 hours and change in brightness of 0.18 magnitude.

Diameter and albedo 

According to the surveys carried out by the Japanese Akari satellite and NASA's Wide-field Infrared Survey Explorer with its subsequent NEOWISE mission, Fanatica measures between 9.31 and 12.16 kilometers in diameter, and its surface has an albedo between 0.189 and 0.388. The Collaborative Asteroid Lightcurve Link assumes a standard albedo for stony asteroids of 0.20 and calculates a diameter of 12.39 kilometers, using an absolute magnitude of 11.9.

Naming 

This minor planet was named in reference to Argentine legend, Eva Perón (1919–1952), also known as "Evita", wife of Argentine President Juan Perón, First Lady of Argentina and idolized by millions. The asteroids 1569 Evita, 1581 Abanderada, 1582 Martir and 1588 Descamisada were also discovered by Itzigsohn, and were also given names in tribute to Perón. The official  was published by the Minor Planet Center in April 1954.

References

External links 
 Lightcurve plot of 1589 Fanatica, Palmer Divide Observatory, B. D. Warner (2003)
 Asteroid Lightcurve Database (LCDB), query form (info )
 Dictionary of Minor Planet Names, Google books
 Asteroids and comets rotation curves, CdR – Observatoire de Genève, Raoul Behrend
 Discovery Circumstances: Numbered Minor Planets (1)-(5000) – Minor Planet Center
 
 

001589
Discoveries by Miguel Itzigsohn
Named minor planets
19500913